Buchach City Hall, also known as the Buchach townhall, is a unique building of architectural significance dating to the mid-18th century in Buchach, Ternopil region, Ukraine. It was built in 1740-1750-th when the city belonged to the Crown of the Kingdom of Poland.

The founder of the cityhall was Mikołaj Bazyli Potocki — Starost of Kaniv, Korsun' and Bohuslav, benefactor of the Buchach's churches, Basilian monastery and Pochayiv Lavra. The building suffered significant damage during a 1811 fire where its spire burned and the height of the structure was reduced by 15 meters.

The architects and sculptors included Bernard Meretyn and Johann Georg Pinsel, whose has been called a Galician Michelangelo.

References

External links
 Ratusha, article originally appeared in the Encyclopedia of Ukraine, vol. 4 (1993).
 Natalia A. Feduschak, The mystical aura of BUCHACH, in WESTERN UKRAINE, article from Kyiv Post, October 24, 2002

townhall
City and town halls in Ukraine